Nick de Jong may refer to:

 Nick de Jong (footballer) (born 1989), Dutch footballer
 Nick de Jong (sailor) (born 1942), Dutch sailor